Niall Quinn (born 22 August 1988 in Dunboyne) is an Irish motor racing driver, currently living in County Meath, Ireland.

Early career 
1999- 3rd place in Irish Karting Championship in Cadet
2000- 1st place in Irish Karting Championship in Cadet
2002- 3rd place in Irish Karting Championship in Junior Intercontinental "A" (JICA)
2003- 1st place in Irish Karting Championship in Junior Intercontinental "A" (JICA)
2004- 5th place in Irish Karting Championship in Formula A
2005- 1st place in Irish Karting Championship in Formula A

Niall Quinn is the only driver in Irish karting history to win Cadet, JICA and Formula "A", the three premier categories in Irish Karting. Quinn also was a junior kart champion, awarded the award in late 2003.

At the end of 2005 Quinn won a worldwide driver shoot-out to win a contract to drive in the Red BullJunior team.

2006 
In 2006 Quinn raced in the Formula BMW UK Championship as a Red Bull Junior driver. With Carlin Motorsport, he was the early leader in the Rookie Cup Championship, for first-time car racers. Quinn finished 3rd in the Rookie Cup Standings, and an 11th position and 5th place in the Formula BMW World Finals (the end of year world championship) with Holzer RennSport was the highlight of the year.

Quinn was dropped by Red Bull and came 3rd in the 2006 Motorsport Ireland Young Racing Driver of the Year awards.

2007 
In 2007 Quinn raced in the Formula BMW Germany Series with Holzer RennSport. He finished 7th in the standings, and scored two podium finishes.

Niall was named Motorsport Ireland Young Racing Driver of the Year in November 2007. As part of this award he won the chance to drive for A1GP Team Ireland in the Australian race at Eastern Creek, Sydney in February 2008.

2008-2010 

In January 2008 Quinn competed in four rounds of the Asian Formula Three series in Batangas, Philippines with Aran Racing. On his Formula Three debut he scored two second-place finishes.

He drove as Rookie driver for Team Ireland in A1GP World Cup of Motorsport, season 3, for the Australian, South African, Mexican, Chinese and Great British rounds of the series. He was signed again signed up for season 4 as rookie driver.

He competed in early rounds of the British Formula 3 series in the National class with Team Loctite in a Dallara Mugen-Honda. Later in the season he raced in the German F3 championship for one round at Oschersleben with Van Amersfoort Racing in a Dallara Volkswagen.

Niall won the Formula Palmer Audi Autumn Trophy, with two wins and 4 podiums.

Despite the success in 2008, Quinn did not race full-time in 2009, only testing for A1 Team Ireland and appearing in a few exhibition events such as the Goodwood Festival of Speed and the Dublin Grand Prix.

He has signed on with Team PBIR to race in the Firestone Indy Lights series beginning with the inaugural race at Barber Motorsports Park in April 2010.

References

External links 
 Niall Quinn's official website
 Motorsport.com  Niall Quinn

1988 births
Living people
Asian Formula Three Championship drivers
British Formula Three Championship drivers
German Formula Three Championship drivers
Indy Lights drivers
Irish racing drivers
Sportspeople from County Meath
A1 Grand Prix Rookie drivers
Formula Palmer Audi drivers
Formula BMW ADAC drivers
Formula BMW UK drivers
Van Amersfoort Racing drivers
Carlin racing drivers